This is a list of mayors of North Adams, Massachusetts. North Adams became a city in 1895.

Mayors

References

North Adams